The Cypriot national cricket team is the team that represents Cyprus in international cricket. They became an International Cricket Council (ICC) affiliate member in 1999, and an associate member in 2017, although it was not until August 2006 that they made their international debut, finishing as runners up in Division Four of the European Championship.

In April 2018, the ICC decided to grant full Twenty20 International (T20I) status to all its members. Therefore, all Twenty20 matches played between Cyprus and other ICC members after 1 January 2019 will be a full T20I.

History
In 2007, the Cyprus Cricket National team competed in the European Division 3 Championships where they finished in 7th place out of 8.

In 2009, Cyprus then hosted the ICC Division 4 Championships in Cyprus which turned out to be a great success for the Cyprus National cricket team winning the Division 4 championship.

In 2011, Cyprus then competed in the ICC Division 2 T20 Championships held in Belgium where they came 10th place in the tournament, beating Sweden in the play-off game for 10th/11th place.

Cyprus were ranked 24th in the ICC European Twenty20 Rankings (as of 29 December 2012).

In 2018, the Cyprus National Team; captained by Muhammad Husain took part in ICC T20 World Cup Europe Qualifier which took place in Holland. Cyprus could only win one game against Austria.

In 2021, Cyprus played 2-match bilateral series against Estonia, making their T20I debut and won the series 2-0.
On the Same tour, Cyprus hosted a tri-series by inviting Isle of Man alongside Estonia. Estonia couldn't secure a single win on that tour while Isle of Man took the title home.

In 2022, National team is scheduled to play ICC Men's Europe Qualifier for 2024 T20 World Cup under the captaincy of Gurpratap Singh. Currently Cyprus is ranked at 59th position at ICC T20I World Ranking.

Tournament history

European Cricket Championship
2006: 2nd place (Division Four)
2007: 7th place (Division Three)
2009: 1st place (Division Four)
2011: 10th place (T20) (Division two)

Current National Squad

The following list contains the players in the Cyprus squad that will be competing at the ICC World T20 Europe Qualifier in July 2022.

Coaching staff
Head Coach - Richard Cox
Team Manager/Assistant Coach - Muhammad Husain

Records
International Match Summary — Cyprus
 
Last updated 19 July 2022.

Twenty20 International 
T20I record versus other nations

Records complete to T20I #1675. Last updated 19 July 2022.

Other results
For a list of selected international matches played by Cyprus, see Cricket Archive.

See also
 List of Cyprus Twenty20 International cricketers

References

External links
 Official Site
 I.C.C Division 2 T20 Championships 2012 https://web.archive.org/web/20130112040231/http://www.cricketeurope4.net/CRICKETEUROPE/DATABASE/2012/TOURNAMENTS/EURODIV2/index.shtml

Cricket in Cyprus
National cricket teams
Cricket
Cyprus in international cricket